Entropy is an abstract strategy board game for two players designed by Eric Solomon in 1977. The game is "based on the eternal conflict in the universe between order and chaos [...] One player is Order, the other Chaos. Order is trying to make patterns vertically and horizontally. Chaos is trying to prevent this." The game originally employed a 5×5 gameboard, but in 2000 a 7x7 board was introduced to allow deeper strategies. 

Entropy was awarded a rare 6 out of 6 by Games & Puzzles Magazine in 1981. David Pritchard called the game "a modern classic". It is sold commercially under the names Hyle (a 5×5 board) and Hyle7 (a 7×7 board).

Rules
The gameboard is a square grid of 7×7 cells. A game consists of two rounds. Each round starts with the board empty, and a bag containing 49 chips in seven colours. 

The first player to move (Chaos) draws coloured chips at random from the bag and places each one on the board in an empty cell. For each chip that is placed, the second player (Order) may slide any chip horizontally or vertically any distance through empty cells, to rest in a currently empty cell. When the board becomes full, the round is finished. Order scores 1 point for each chip in any palindromic pattern of chip colours (e.g. red–green–blue–green–red scores 3 + 5 = 8 points; red–red–red scores 2 + 2 + 3 = 7 points) occurring either horizontally or vertically. The players reverse roles and play a second round. The player with the higher score as Order wins the game.

Championships
The game has been included as one of the events at the annual Mind Sports Olympiad since its inception. Demis Hassabis had won this event a record five times until losing in 2007. Demis' record was broken in 2021 by David Jameson (Wales) who won his sixth title. The event has also been won by Hassabis's brother George and by other Pentamind champions, David M. Pearce, Alain Dekker, Paco Garcia de la Banda and Andres Kuusk.

 1997:  Murray Heasman
 1998:  Peter Horlock
 1999:  George Hassabis
 2000:  Demis Hassabis
 2001:  Demis Hassabis
 2002:  David M. Pearce
 2003:  Demis Hassabis
 2004:  Demis Hassabis
 2005:  Peter Horlock
 2006:  Demis Hassabis
 2007:  David M. Pearce
 2008:  Peter Horlock
 2009:  Alain Dekker
 2010:  Paco Garcia de la Banda
 2011:  Peter Horlock
 2012:  Andres Kuusk
 2013:  Andres Kuusk
 2014:  David Jameson
 2015:  Andres Kuusk
 2016:  David Jameson
 2017:  David Jameson
 2018:  David Jameson
 2019:  David Jameson
 2020:  David Jameson
 2021:  Paul Kolk
 2022:  Alain Dekker

References

Bibliography

Further reading

External links

Online play (as "Entropy") at Super Duper Games

Board games introduced in 1977
Abstract strategy games